Beth Levison is an American independent documentary film producer and director based in New York City.

Life and career
Levison was born in Pittsfield, Massachusetts and went to Middlebury College. Recent films that she produced include Netflix's The Martha Mitchell Effect (2022), Independent Lens' Women in Blue (2021) and HBO's 32 Pills:  My Sister’s Suicide (2017). Other recent films include Storm Lake, which she directed alongside cinematographer Jerry Risius and also produced; it was nominated for a 2022 Peabody Award and a 2022 News and Documentary Emmy Award. Over the course of her career, she has shared in two Peabody Awards and two Primetime Emmy Awards on the HBO series Classical Baby (2005) and the HBO program Goodnight Moon & Other Sleepytime Tales (1999).

Levison is the founder of Hazel Pictures and the co-founder of the Documentary Producers Alliance. She is a member of the Academy of Motion Picture Arts and Sciences, was producing faculty with the School of Visual Arts’ Social Documentary Film Program from 2014-2020, and currently teaches as guest faculty at Sarah Lawrence College.

Selected filmography

Awards and nominations

References

External links
 

Living people
American documentary film producers
American documentary film directors
Year of birth missing (living people)
American women documentary filmmakers